Esmaeil Ebadi (born 11 August 1976) is an Iranian Archer who won the gold medal at the 2014 Asian Games. He also won a gold medal in 2015 World Archery Championships in team event.

References 
 Profile

1976 births
Living people
Iranian male archers
Asian Games gold medalists for Iran
Asian Games bronze medalists for Iran
Asian Games medalists in archery
Archers at the 2014 Asian Games
Archers at the 2018 Asian Games
World Archery Championships medalists
Medalists at the 2014 Asian Games
World Games silver medalists
Competitors at the 2017 World Games
World Games medalists in archery
Islamic Solidarity Games competitors for Iran
Islamic Solidarity Games medalists in archery